Echinopsis glauca,  is a species of Echinopsis found in Peru.

References

External links
 
 

glauca